The Born to Run tours were the unofficially-named concert tours surrounding the release of Bruce Springsteen's 1975 album Born to Run which occurred between 1974 and 1977. The album represented Springsteen's commercial breakthrough, and was marked by a grueling and meticulous recording process. To make ends meet Springsteen and the E Street Band toured constantly during the first set of recording sessions for it, performing his new songs as he developed them. Financial success was short-lived, however, as he was soon plunged into legal battles with his former manager Mike Appel and enjoined from further studio recording. Touring continued as a means of making a living, long after the conventional period of playing in connection with an album's release was over; only when his legal issues were finally resolved in 1977 did these tours conclude.

Tours

Prelude
During 1974, as in previous years, Springsteen was touring almost all the time. He had written the song "Born to Run" early in the year, and is known to have been playing it in concert by May if not earlier. Early versions of album futures "She's the One" (with parts of what would become "Backstreets") and "Jungleland" (without the Clarence Clemons' later-famous saxophone solo and with an extra section at the end) were beginning to appear in set lists.  But several events crystallized in the late summer of 1974. Springsteen played his last ever gig as an opening act on August 3; after that, he would always be the headliner. On August 14, he played his last show with David Sancious and Ernest "Boom" Carter in the band.

New Members Tour
There was over a month's break, then on September 19 he played his first shows, at The Main Point in Bryn Mawr, Pennsylvania, with Max Weinberg and Roy Bittan in the band; these were also the first shows where the band was explicitly billed as the E Street Band. 

Violinist and stage foil Suki Lahav joined the band in early October. Shows were played up and down the East Coast to help integrate the new members' sound into the band as well as to provide some income while recording sessions dragged on — finances were always tight and manager Mike Appel often had to borrow money to pay the road crew. An advanced, slightly different mix of "Born to Run" was given to certain progressive rock radio stations throughout November; it made an immediate impression and stimulated interest in Springsteen's first two albums and his concerts. On February 5, 1975, another Main Point show was broadcast in its entirety by Philadelphia's WMMR; "Thunder Road" made its first, work-in-progress appearance under the title "Wings for Wheels", and the (unusually long at the time) 2 hour 40 minute show overall is regarded as one of Springsteen's best ever. It was also frequently bootlegged soon thereafter, beginning a pattern that would continue for much of Springsteen's career.

This tour came to a close on March 9, 1975 after two shows in Washington, D.C.'s Constitution Hall. It is thought that Steven Van Zandt appeared in both shows, but in any case it was the last appearances of Suki Lahav, who moved back to Israel soon thereafter.

Born to Run Tour
The Born to Run Tour proper began more than a month ahead of the album's release date, on July 20, 1975 at the Palace Theatre in Providence, Rhode Island. Van Zandt was now a full-fledged member of the band. "Tenth Avenue Freeze-Out" made its first appearance, but the shows were still dominated by older material. Playing mostly the Northeast, by early August "Backstreets" itself had appeared. Since Springsteen was a prolific songwriter at the time, other originals of his would appear, be played for a while and then disappear, never making it onto any album.

Beginning on August 13 was a key 5-night stand at New York City's The Bottom Line club. Columbia Records had put up posters of Springsteen around the city, the audience was heavy with press and music industry types, and an August 15 show was broadcast live by influential WNEW-FM. The shows were judged a success and further paved the way for Springsteen's big time emergence; many years later, Rolling Stone magazine would name the stand as one of the 50 Moments That Changed Rock and Roll.
A similar 4-night, 6-show, high-profile stand was conducted beginning October 16 at The Roxy in West Hollywood; in attendance were Jack Nicholson, Warren Beatty, Cher, Ryan O'Neal, and Carole King, as well as various entertainment industry executives. By October 27 the publicity push had reached its climax and Springsteen was on the covers of both Time and Newsweek.

This tour ended with a New Year's Eve 1975 show at the Tower Theatre in Philadelphia. The show was recorded onto multitrack and eventually released as a bootleg. The show includes a rare performance of "Night" along with a ballad version of "Tenth Avenue Freeze-Out."

European Tour
However, during the previous month, Springsteen had made his first very brief foray into Western Europe, playing London's Hammersmith Odeon on November 18, 1975. It did not go too well, as Springsteen famously had a meltdown when he saw a lot of hyped-up Columbia Records publicity for him everywhere in London. The performance was captured on film that night (later released on DVD as Hammersmith Odeon London '75), and Springsteen was clearly bothered and kept fussing with a too-large stocking cap on his head. Single shows in Sweden and the Netherlands followed, capped by a return to the Hammersmith on November 24.  Chastened, Springsteen would not return to Europe for six years. (Ironically, by the 1990s and 2000s Europe would become Springsteen's strongest and most loyal fan base.)

Chicken Scratch Tour
This colorfully named tour began on March 25, 1976; the official 1984 Springsteen chronology would state of that date, "The fabled 'Chicken Scratch Tour' begins, taking Springsteen and E Streeters on an extremely meandering route through the south, midwest, and northeast United States." The name was actually given by the band's road crew, due to many of the shows being in secondary markets in the South.

After the April 29 show in Memphis' Ellis Auditorium, Springsteen decided to catch a taxi to Graceland. Upon arrival he had noticed a light on in the house and proceeded to jump the gates and walk to the front door. Security intervened at which point Springsteen asked if Elvis Presley was home, but Presley was in fact in Lake Tahoe. The guards not having any idea who this visitor was, even after Springsteen tried to explain it to them and state that he had been on the covers of Time and Newsweek, politely escorted him to the street. Years later Springsteen would tell the story in concerts and reminisce about what he would have said to Presley had he answered the door.

Then, of this tour's end on May 28, 1976, the officially chronology stated: "Chicken Scratch Tour draws to a merciless conclusion with a show at the U.S. Naval Academy in Annapolis, Maryland, which features a rousing version of Frankie Ford's 'Sea Cruise'."

Interlude
This likely would have been the end of touring until a new album was out. But during 1976 the relationship between Springsteen and his now former manager and producer, Mike Appel, had deteriorated, and during July Appel threatened action against Springsteen, Springsteen filed suit against Appel, and Appel countersued.

Meanwhile, in August Springsteen and the band played some local shows, mostly in Red Bank, New Jersey, with The Miami Horns on loan from Southside Johnny and the Asbury Jukes. Two new songs intended for the next album, Darkness on the Edge of Town were performed., "Something in the Night" and "Rendezvous", were performed – the first would make the album while the second became a modest hit for Greg Kihn.

Except that on September 15, the judge in the lawsuits case ruled that Springsteen was enjoined from any further recording with Columbia Records until Appel's suit was resolved.

U.S. Tour a/k/a Lawsuit Tour
Thus Springsteen had to hit the road again to have any source of income (as proceeds from Born to Run sales being tied up in various accounting disputes as well).

What the official Springsteen chronology called the U.S. Tour ran from September 26 through November 4, 1976, starting at the Arizona Veterans Memorial Coliseum in Phoenix and ending with a six-night stand at The Palladium in New York. This tour was also with a horn section, also billed as The Miami Horns, but different from the previous group and unrelated to the Asbury Jukes.  Along the way Springsteen played his first headlining shows in an arena, The Spectrum in Philadelphia, but he used curtains to partition off part of the venue.

The Lawsuit Drags On Tour
The court cases carried on, with battles being fought over various procedural rulings, and still Springsteen could not enter the studio. So back out he went, for a group of shows that the official chronology does not even attempt to label. This run began on February 7, 1977 at the Palace Theatre in Albany, New York, and continued for 33 shows in the U.S. and Canada.

By now Springsteen was quite disheartened, and before a February 15 show in Detroit, he for the first time in his life did not want to get up on stage. "At that moment, I could see how people get into drinking or into drugs, because the one thing you want at a time like that is to be distracted—in a big way", he later told writer Robert Hilburn.
Nonetheless, he rebounded, and eventually this run concluded on March 25, 1977 at the Music Hall in Boston.

Postlude
Meanwhile, the lawsuits had moved in the direction of settlement, and final settlement was reached on May 28, 1977. Springsteen entered the studio three days later to begin recording sessions for Darkness on the Edge of Town. The Born to Run tours were finally over.

The shows
It was during these tours that the Springsteen concert image took form. He had stopped wearing sunglasses on stage and was now more accessible.  His baggy pants, T-shirt, worn leather jacket and sloppy headwear look was now offset by two frontline visual foils, as both saxophonist Clarence Clemons and guitarist Steven Van Zandt were stylishly dressed in suits and distinctive hats.

Musically, the E Street Band now had its fullest sound, with two keyboards and a saxophone augmenting two guitars and the usual bass and drums. Springsteen did not just play songs as they were on his records — they were often rearranged or extended with playful, poignant, or angry spoken narratives. Oldies from the early to mid-1960s were often brought in to supplement Springsteen's own material; The Animals' "It's My Life" was one such example, slowed down to try to increase the song's tension factor and preceded by what would become a Springsteen concert staple, the long bitter story about how he and his father did not get along at all with respect to the course Springsteen's life took as a teenager.

Springsteen's performances were also frenetic, with him jumping into crowds and singing on tables during the shows held in clubs.

Material from Born to Run grew in importance as the tour went on, but even the newest material could be quickly recast. Most notably, "Thunder Road" was changed from the spirited, sweeping album version into a surprisingly quiet and pleading show opener, featuring Springsteen singing while standing still at the microphone stand, guitar slung behind him, with only Roy Bittan's piano and Danny Federici's electronic glockenspiel accompanying him.  (Producer Jon Landau later said that the stark presentation was partly due to the full band having trouble playing the album's arrangement.) "Backstreets" was augmented with a guitar line far more prominent than on record, while "Night", one of the least visible tracks on the album, became a show opener for a spell as well.

As the later tours took place and Springsteen became frustrated with his legal situation, the shows became his only outlet. Horn sections were added, songs further arranged, and more oldies pulled out. Performances sometimes reached the three- or four-hour mark. New material such as the bitter "The Promise" would appear out of nowhere, then disappear again.

Songs performed

Commercial and critical reaction
The high-profile August 1975 The Bottom Line shows won raves from music critics. Rolling Stone said that a star had been born and that "Springsteen is everything that has been claimed for him", while the E Street Band "may very well be the great American rock & roll band."  The New York Times said that the shows "will rank among the great rock experiences of those lucky enough to get in." The Bottom Line co-owner Alan Pepper said that Springsteen "brought the house to a fever pitch again and again and again, and the band stayed with him all the way. It was absolutely amazing, and I mean that. In all my years in the music business, I have never seen anything like those performances."

Reaction was similar in other locations; Los Angeles Times writer Robert Hilburn later stated that "the Born to Run shows were hailed in city after city as among the finest ever in rock."

Broadcasts and recordings
In addition to the Main Point and The Bottom Line shows already mentioned, the October 17, 1975 show at The Roxy in West Hollywood was broadcast live on KWST-FM.  Springsteen also made some visits to radio stations during the tours in which interviews and performances were conducted.

The 1986 Live/1975–85 box set contained just one selection from any of the Born to Run tours, the "solo piano" (and electronic glockenspiel) "Thunder Road" taken from the following night's show at The Roxy. (The lack of further coverage of the tours was one reason for fans' dissatisfaction with the box set at the time; Springsteen management said the available recordings did not have good enough sound quality).

In 2005, as part of the Born to Run 30th Anniversary Edition re-release package, a full-length concert film was assembled of the notorious November 18, 1975 Hammersmith Odeon show in London and included as a DVD.  This was subsequently also released as the CD Hammersmith Odeon London '75.

Several shows have been released as part of the Bruce Springsteen Archives:
 Tower Theater, Philadelphia 1975, released February 10, 2015
 Palace Theatre, Albany 1977, released August 4, 2017
 Auditorium Theatre, Rochester, NY 1977, released August 4, 2017
 The Roxy 1975, released December 7, 2018
 "London 11/24/1975", released December 4, 2020

Personnel
 Bruce Springsteen – lead vocals, guitars, harmonica
The E Street Band:
 Roy Bittan – piano
 Clarence Clemons – saxophone, percussion, background vocals
 Danny Federici – organ, electronic glockenspiel, accordion
 Suki Lahav – violin, background vocals (October 1974-March 1975)
 Garry Tallent – bass guitar
 Steven Van Zandt – guitars, background vocals (from July 1975)
 Max Weinberg – drums
Miami Horns #1: (August 1976)
 Rick Gazda – (trumpet)
Eddie Manion – (baritone sax)
 Carlo Novi – (tenor sax)
 Tony Palligrossi – (trumpet)
Miami Horns #2 : (September 1976 – March 1977)
 John Binkley (trumpet)
 Ed De Palma (saxophone),
 Dennis Orlock (trombone)
 Steve Paraczky (trumpet)

Tour dates

New Members Tour

Born to Run Tour

Chicken Scratch Tour

Box office score data

U.S. Tour a/k/a Lawsuit Tour

Box office score data

The Lawsuit Drags On Tour

Box office score data

Cancellations and rescheduled shows

Sources
 Born in the U.S.A. Tour (tour booklet, 1984), Springsteen chronology.
 Hilburn, Robert. Springsteen. Rolling Stone Press, 1985. .
 Marsh, Dave. Glory Days: Bruce Springsteen in the 1980s. Pantheon Books, 1987. .
 Eliot, Marc with Appel, Mike. Down Thunder Road. Simon & Schuster, 1992.  .
 Santelli, Robert. Greetings From E Street: The Story of Bruce Springsteen and the E Street Band. Chronicle Books, 2006. .
 Brucebase's concert descriptions and chronology a gold mine of valuable material

References

Bruce Springsteen concert tours
1974 concert tours
1975 concert tours
1976 concert tours
1977 concert tours